Nokia 5330 Mobile TV Edition is a mobile phone from Nokia, announced on 16 November 2009. It features a DVB-H television receiver, and has been Nokia's only non-smartphone to do so. Its design is based on that of the Nokia 5330 XpressMusic, announced earlier in 2009.

See also
Nokia N92
Nokia N77
Nokia N96
Nokia N8
Nokia SU-33W (External Bluetooth DVB-H receiver)

References

External links
Technical specifications 

5330
Mobile phones introduced in 2009
Slider phones